Dead Wood is a 2009 novel by the British writer Chris Longmuir.  It won the Dundee International Book Prize, the largest monetary British Prize for first novels, in 2009, and was published by Polygon Books.  The novel is based upon the unsolved murders of 18-year-old Carol Lannen and 20-year-old Elizabeth McCabe in Scotland during the 1970s.

See also
 2009 in literature
 Scottish literature

References

2009 British novels
English-language novels
Scottish novels
Historical mystery novels
Novels set in the 1970s
2009 debut novels
Polygon Books books